New Caney Independent School District (NCISD) is a public school district based in New Caney—an unincorporated area of southeastern Montgomery County, Texas (USA) within the Houston–The Woodlands–Sugar Land metropolitan area.

NCISD serves the cities of Roman Forest and Woodbranch, as well as much of Porter Heights, and much of the minuscule Montgomery County portion of Houston. NCISD also serves the unincorporated communities of Porter and New Caney.

For the 2018–2019 school year, the district received a score of 85 out of 100 from the Texas Education Agency.

History
A common school district in the New Caney area was established in 1938. The district was converted into an independent school district on January 12, 1957.

Schools

High schools (9-12)
 New Caney High School
 Porter High School
 Infinity Early College High School
 West Fork High School

Middle schools (6-8)
 Keefer Crossing Middle School
 Pine Valley Middle School
 White Oak Middle School
 Woodridge Forest Middle School

Elementary schools (K-5)
 Bens Branch Elementary School
 Brookwood Forest Elementary School
 Crippen Elementary School
 Dogwood Elementary School
 Kings Manor Elementary School
 New Caney Elementary School
 Oakley Elementary School
 Porter Elementary School
 Sorters Mill Elementary School
 Tavola Elementary School
 Valley Ranch Elementary School

References

External links

 New Caney Independent School District

School districts in Montgomery County, Texas
School districts in Houston
1957 establishments in Texas
School districts established in 1957